The men's 200-metre freestyle event at the 2001 World Aquatic Championships took place 25 July. The heats and semi-finals were on 24 July.

Results

Heats

Final

Key: WR = World record

References
Results from swimrankings.net Retrieved 2012-08-14

Swimming at the 2001 World Aquatics Championships